This is an incomplete list of Bien de Interés Cultural landmarks in the Province of Lugo, Spain.

 Basilica of San Martiño de Mondoñedo
 Castrodouro Castle
 Church of San Xoán, Portomarín
 Lugo Cathedral
 Monastery of Santa María de Meira
 Monastery of San Xulián de Samos
 Mondoñedo Cathedral
 Roman walls of Lugo
 Serra dos Ancares

References 

Bien de Interés Cultural landmarks in the Province of Lugo
Lugo